The Zastava M57 pistol was the standard sidearm of the Yugoslav Army from 1957 to the country's collapse, produced by Zastava Arms. A licensed copy of the Soviet TT pistol, it is a single-action semi-automatic pistol chambered in 7.62×25mm Tokarev. Many surplus M57 handguns were imported for sale in other countries and subsequently modified to fit their import requirements, and have become frequent collector's items due to their low price and historical value.

As of 2022, Zastava still produces modern reproductions of the M57 with updated safety features - the M57A in its original chambering and the M70A in 9mm Parabellum.

History
Adopted in 1957, the M57 was a license-produced copy of the Soviet Tokarev TT pistol. Yugoslavian army surplus M57s were imported to the United States in large numbers by many companies, such as Century International Arms and K-VAR/FIME, and have become common collectors items.

Design details
An improved copy of the TT-33 design, most notably including a longer grip and 9-round magazine, and less notably, a larger magazine release button, a captive recoil spring, and an automatic magazine safety. The larger 9-round magazines of the M57 makes it incompatible with standard 8-round Tokarev magazines. Originally, the pistol has no manual safeties except for a half-cock notch on the hammer.

Due to BATFE import restrictions, poor-quality frame or trigger safeties were frequently fitted to surplus models imported to the United States.

Users

Former users

See also

Zastava Arms
Zastava M70 (.32 ACP/.380 ACP)
Zastava M88
Zastava CZ 99
Zastava PPZ
TT pistol

Semi-automatic pistols of Serbia
Semi-automatic pistols of Yugoslavia
7.62×25mm Tokarev semi-automatic pistols
Zastava Arms
TT platform
Weapons and ammunition introduced in 1957